The Yugoslav Ground Forces (  – KoV,  – КоВ) was the ground forces branch of the Yugoslav People's Army (JNA) from 1 March 1945 until 20 May 1992 when it became the Ground Forces of Serbia and Montenegro (then called Federal Republic of Yugoslavia) under the threat of sanctions.

History
The origins of the JNA can be found in the Yugoslav Partisan units of World War II. As a part of the Resistance during World War II People's Liberation War of Yugoslavia, the People's Liberation Army of Yugoslavia (NOVJ), a predecessor of JNA, was formed on 22 December 1941 in the town of Rudo in Bosnia and Herzegovina with the establishment of the 1st Proletarian Brigade. After the liberation of the country from the Axis Powers occupation, that date was officially celebrated as the Day of the Army in the SFR Yugoslavia.

In March 1945, the NOVJ was renamed the Yugoslav Army (Jugoslovenska Armija) and finally on its 10th anniversary on 22 December 1951, received the adjective People's (i.e. Narodna).

From eight divisions in the early 1950s, the ground forces grew to what the ISS estimated as a strength of 220,000, including 13 infantry, 3 armoured, and 6 mountain divisions, and 14 independent brigades, including an airborne and a marine infantry brigade, in August 1966.

In September 1968, the Territorial Defense (TO) was formed to support the JNA and on 21 February 1974 TO units were subordinated to their provinces or republics. Thus the JNA and TO became equal parts of the Yugoslav Armed Forces (Oružane Snage SFRJ).

In July 1970, the International Institute for Strategic Studies estimated the Yugoslav ground forces to include 200,000 personnel, nine infantry divisions with some T-34 tanks; one armoured division with M47 Patton, T-54, and T-55 tanks; 33 independent infantry brigades, 12 independent tank brigades, one marine infantry brigade, one airborne brigade, 650 M4 Sherman tanks, PT-76 and about 35 AMX-13 tanks, M-3, BTR-50, and BTR-60P armoured personnel carriers, SU-100 self propelled guns, and 105mm and 155 howitzers, SA-2 "Guideline" surface to air missiles, and SU-57P self propelled anti aircraft guns.
 
In accordance with the 1974 Yugoslav Constitution the Land Forces were divided into six armies allocated to the five republics:
 First Army (Belgrade) – northern part of Central Serbia and Northern Serbia (Vojvodina)
 Second Army (Niš) – southern part of Central Serbia and Southern Serbia (Kosovo and Metohia)
 Third Army (Skopje) – Macedonia
 Fifth Army (Zagreb) – Croatia
 Seventh Army (Sarajevo) – Bosnia and Herzegovina
 Ninth Army (Ljubljana) – Slovenia
 Included II Corps (Titograd)

Plus the Coastal Naval District (Split) – formerly Fourth Army

As of July 1979 the International Institute for Strategic Studies estimated the Yugoslav ground forces to include 190,000 personnel (including 130,000 conscripts), eight infantry divisions, seven independent tank brigades, 12 independent infantry brigades, two mountain infantry brigades, one airborne battalion, 12 artillery regiments, six anti-tank artillery regiments, and 12 anti-aircraft artillery regiments.

Tensions between the JNA and the TO became evident at the political situation in Yugoslavia deteriorated in the 1980s. The Federal government became concerned that Yugoslavia's constituent republics would use the TO to facilitate their secession from Yugoslavia and therefore disarmed the Kosovo TO of 130,000 members. In 1988 the JNA absorbed the entire TO with the Bosnian Serb General Blagoje Adžić becoming the JNA Chief of the Armed Forces General Staff.

In 1988 the armies were reorganized into Military Districts or Regions which no longer corresponded to internal borders thereby making it harder for the republics to control their own forces. Apart from the Proletarian Guard, a mechanized corps, the Land Forces infantry divisions were reorganized into 17 Corps each consisting of four to eight brigades. In late June 1990, the JNA dissolved the 6th Proletarian Infantry Division and the Zagreb city defence command.

1991 organization 

Once considered the fourth strongest army in Europe with 140,000 active troops and million reserves, in 1991, at the outbreak of the Yugoslav Wars the ground forces were organized in four military regions. The First, Third and Fifth corresponded to the three field armies of the ground forces. The Air Force and Air Defence followed this pattern with the First, Third and Fifth Air Corps. Small number of units of the ground and air forces were outside of the military regions directly under General Staff command and control. The fourth military region was the Military Sea Region (or Naval Region), a joint Navy / Ground Forces formation, which was in general commanded by the chief of the Navy, with ground forces units for coastal defence in the rear of the naval artillery. The Military Sea Region did not have tactical aviation units assigned and air support was provided by the three air corps.

 General Staff of the Yugoslav People's Army (Belgrade-Kneževac)
units and formations directly under the General Staff
Special Forces Group of the General Staff (Pančevo)
Guards Mechanised Brigade (Belgrade)
63rd Airborne Brigade (Niš) (formally part of the Air Force)
additional units and formations
 First Military Region (Belgrade-Topčider), Northern Theatre (responsible for eastern Croatia (Slavonia), northern part of Central Serbia, Northern Serbia (Vojvodina) and Bosnia and Herzegovina).
 units and formations directly under the First MR
Proletarian Guards Mechanized Division, (Belgrade-Banjica) (reduced strength in peacetime)
4th Motorized Division (reduced strength in peacetime) (disbanded in 1990)
22nd Infantry Division (reduced strength in peacetime) (disbanded in 1990)
River Flotilla (Novi Sad)
Belgrade City Defence Command (Belgrade)
other units and formations
4th Corps (Sarajevo)
5th Corps (Banja Luka)
12th Corps (Novi Sad)
17th Corps (Tuzla)
24th Corps (Kragujevac)
37th Corps (Titovo Užice)
 Third Military Region (Skopje), South-Eastern Theatre (southern part of Central Serbia, Southern Serbia (Kosovo and Metohia), inland Montenegro) and Republic of Macedonia
units and formations directly under the Third MR
37th Motorized Division (Raška) (reduced strength in peacetime) (disbanded in 1990)
other units and formations
 2nd Corps (Titograd)
21st Corps (Niš)
41st Corps (Bitola)
42nd Corps (Kumanovo)
52nd Corps (Pristina), probably included the 125th Motorised Brigade (:sr:125. моторизована бригада), formed 1981 in Mitrovica
Fifth Military Region (Zagreb), North-Western Theatre (Slovenia and northern Croatia)
units and formations directly under the Fifth MR
6th Proletarian Infantry Division (Karlovac) (reduced strength in peacetime) (disbanded in 1990)
Zagreb City Defense Command (Zagreb) (disbanded in 1990)
other units and formations
10th Corps (Zagreb) (established in 1990 by combining 6th PI Division and the Zagreb CDC)
13th Corps (Rijeka)
14th Corps (Ljubljana)
31st Corps (Maribor)
32nd Corps (Varaždin)
 Military Sea Region (Split-Žrnovnica) (Southeast Croatia (Dalmatia) and the Croatian and Montenegrin coastline)
Yugoslav Navy
Fleet
other naval units and formations
Naval Bastions (fortifications on the Dalmatian islands)
Coastal Artillery
5th Military Sea Sector (Pula) (formed around the 139. Naval Infantry Brigade in Pula (reorganized as 139th Motorized Brigade around 1990) and additional units)
8th Military Sea Sector (Šibenik) (formed around the 11th (Proletarian) Naval Infantry Brigade in Šibenik (reorganized as 12th Amphibious Brigade around 1990) and additional units)
9th Military Sea Sector (Kumbor) (formed around the 472nd Naval Infantry Brigade in Trebinje) (reorganized as 472nd Motorized Brigade around 1990) and additional units)
9th Corps (Knin)

In 1990 the army had nearly completed a major overhaul of its basic force structure. It eliminated its old divisional infantry organization and established the brigade as the largest operational unit. The army converted ten of twelve infantry divisions into twenty-nine tank, mechanized, and mountain infantry brigades with integral artillery, air defense, and anti-tank regiments. One airborne brigade was organized before 1990. The shift to brigade-level organization provided greater operational flexibility, maneuverability, and tactical initiative, and it reduced the possibility that large army units would be destroyed in setpiece engagements with an aggressor. The change created many senior field command positions that would develop relatively young and talented officers. The brigade structure also was more appropriate at a time of declining manpower.

Corps
There were 17 Corps (both named and numbered), they consist of the following:

 Serbian (x 5) – 12th, 21st, 24th, 37th, and 52nd
 Croatian (x 4) – 9th, 10th, 13th, and 32nd
 Bosnia-Herzegovinian (x 3) – 4th, 5th, and 17th
 Macedonian (x 2) – 41st and 42nd
 Slovene (x 2) – 14th and 31st
 Montenegrin (x 1) – 2nd

Each Corps contained the following:
 Corps Headquarters Troops,
 Corps combat Support – three artillery regiments (one mixed artillery, one mixed anti-tank, one light anti-aircraft), and six battalions (engineers, signals, military police, NBC (Nuclear Biological Chemical), medical, and replacement).
 Corps combat forces consisted of four armoured/mechanized/motorized brigades, plus infantry, light infantry, and mountain brigades.

During the course of the ten-year-long Yugoslav wars, corps were modified by being reinforced with extra units from out of theatre; battalions then became regiments and regiments became brigades. However many units were also disbanded when their non-Serbian/Montenegrin personnel deserted.

Personnel
In the 1980s the ground forces had about 140,000 active-duty soldiers (including 90,000 conscripts) and could mobilize over a million trained reservists in wartime. Most soldiers were of Serbian, Croatian, Bosnian, Macedonian or Montenegrin origin. Reserve forces were organized along republican lines into Partisan Forces and Territorial Defence Forces and in wartime they were to be subordinate to JNA Supreme Command as an integral part of the defence system. The Territorial Defence Forces (reserve force) was made up of former conscripts and they were occasionally called up for war exercises.

The ground forces were subdivided into infantry, armour, field artillery, and air defence artillery, as well as signal, engineering and chemical defence corps.

Operations

The Ten-Day War
During the Ten Day War the JNA performed abysmally as many of the Yugoslav soldiers did not realise they were taking part in a real military operation, rather an exercise, until they came under attack. The officer corps was dominated by Serbs and Montenegrins and in many cases ideologically committed to Yugoslav unity. The rank and file troops however were conscripts, many who had no strong motivation in fighting against the Slovenes. Of the soldiers of the 5th Military District, which was in action in Slovenia, in 1990 30% were Albanians, 20% Croats, 15 to 20% Serbs and Montenegrins, 10% Bosniaks, and 8% Slovenes. The JNA eventually lost nearly all of its Slovenian and Croat personnel, becoming an almost entirely Serbian and Montenegrin force. Its poor performance in Slovenia and later in Croatia discredited its leadership – Kadijević resigned as defence minister in January 1992, and Adžić was forced into medical retirement shortly afterwards. Due to the short duration (10 Days) and relatively low intensity of the war, casualties were low. According to Slovenian estimates, the JNA suffered 44 fatalities and 146 wounded, while 4,692 JNA soldiers and 252 federal police officers were captured by the Slovenian side. According to post-war assessments made by the JNA, its material losses amounted to 31 tanks, 22 armoured personnel carriers, 6 helicopters, 6,787 infantry weapons, 87 artillery pieces and 124 air defence weapons damaged, destroyed or confiscated. Property damage was fairly light, due to the scattered and short-term nature of the fighting.

Infantry

The ground forces led in personnel. It had about 540,000 active-duty soldiers (including 120,000 conscripts) and could mobilize over a million trained reservists in wartime. Reserve forces were organized along republics' lines into Territorial Defence Forces and in wartime they were to be subordinate to JNA Supreme Command as an integral part of defence system. Territorial Defence (reserve force) was made up of former conscripts and they were occasionally called up for war exercises.

The ground forces were infantry, armour, artillery, and air defence, as well as signal, engineering and chemical defence corps.

Equipment
Assault Rifles
Zastava M70
Machine guns
Zastava M53
Zastava M84
Zastava M72
Zastava M77
Submachine guns
Skorpion vz. 61
Sniper Rifles
Zastava M76

Pistols
CZ-99
Launchers
M80 Zolja
M79 Osa
M90 Stršljen

Gallery

Tank and armoured brigades

Yugoslav tank brigades comprised two or three battalions each with 31 tanks in three ten tank companies. They operated 1114 Soviet T-54s and T-55s, 73 Soviet T-72s, 443 Yugoslav M-84s, and some United States-made M-47 tanks. The army's tanks were in many respects its most obsolete forces. The T-54/-55 was a frontline model during the 1960s. Domestic production of the M-84 (an improved version of the Soviet T-72 built under license in Yugoslavia) was providing the army with a late 1970s and 1980s model. The army also had a reserve of old T-34/85 and Sherman tanks from World War II.

The Yugoslav army had 995 M-80A IFVs and 551 M-60P armored personnel carriers produced domestically. The infantry also operated more than 200 Soviet-made BTR-152, BTR-40, and BTR-50 armored personnel carriers (APCs), which had been purchased in the 1960s and 1970s. It had 100 M-3A1 half-tracked personnel carriers produced by the United States and a small number of new Romanian TAB-72 (a variant of the BTR-60) armored personnel carriers. Armored reconnaissance vehicles included a few older Soviet BTR-40s, newer BRDM-2 and BTR-60 models, and domestic BOV and M-8 vehicles.

Equipment

Light Tanks
PT-76 – 63
Medium Tanks
M-4 Sherman – 630 (including M-32, M32B1 and M-74 tank recovery vehicles, stored in reserve)
T-34/85 – 889
M-47 Patton – 319
T-55 – 1614 

Main Battle Tanks
T-72 – 73
M-84 – 443
Tank Destroyers
SU-100 – 40
M18 Hellcat – ~260
M36 Jackson – ~300
APC's
MT-LB – 40
OT M-60 – 551
BTR-50 – ~200
BTR-60 – 80
TAB-72 – 40
IFV's
BVP M-80 – 995
Armored Reconnaissance Vehicles
BRDM-2 – 80
BOV APC – 317 (successor state)

Artillery 

Yugoslav artillery regiments were well equipped with Soviet, U.S. and domestic systems. Soviet artillery in these units consisted of approximately 1,000 towed 122 mm howitzers, 130 mm guns, 152 mm gun/howitzers, and 155 mm howitzers. There were about 700 older United States 105 mm and 155 mm towed guns and domestically produced models such as the M-65 in the artillery regiments. Towed pieces were very important for operations in the country's mountainous terrain.

Artillery units operated Soviet 100 mm and 122 mm and Yugoslav-produced 105 mm M-7 self-propelled guns. Those units had over 8,000 82 mm and 120 mm mortars, including a self-propelled 82 mm mortar mounted on an M-60PB variant of the standard armored personnel carrier.

Yugoslav artillery units operated several battlefield missile systems including 160 128 mm YMRL-32 and M-63 multiple-rocket launchers. The arsenal included four launchers for Soviet FROG-7 surface-to-surface missiles. First fielded in 1967, the unguided FROG-7 had a range of 100 kilometers.

Equipment
Mountain artillery
 M48 (a.k.a. the Tito Gun)
Towed Artillery
M56 – ? 

D-30 (D-30J, D-30JA1) – 120
D-74 – ?
M-46 – 250–300
D-20 – 20
M84 "NORA A" – 84
Self-propelled Howitzer
2S1 Gvozdika – 100
Rocket Artillery
M-63 Plamen – ~800
M-77 Oganj	– ~120
M-87 Orkan – ~10
FROG-7 – 10

Anti-tank regiments

Yugoslav anti-tank regiments had towed anti-tank guns, recoilless rifles, and Soviet anti-tank guided missiles. Antitank guns included 75 mm, 90 mm, and 100 mm models. They were Soviet produced with the exception of the 90 mm M-63B2, which was manufactured domestically.

The recoilless rifles were manufactured domestically and included 57 mm, 82 mm, and 105 mm models. Two self-propelled 82 mm recoilless rifles could be mounted on an M-60PB armored personnel carrier.

Anti-tank guided missiles were the Soviet AT-1 (NATO: Snapper) and AT-3 (NATO: Sagger). They were used in both anti-tank and infantry units, but because of their early vintage, effectiveness against advanced armor was uncertain. The four wheeled BOV-1 armored reconnaissance vehicle could be equipped with six AT-3 launchers to serve as a highly mobile anti-tank platform.

Air defense

Larger Yugoslav army units had considerable tactical air defense assets, designed to defend major troop concentrations against enemy air strikes. The ground forces had four surface-to-air missile regiments and eleven antiaircraft artillery regiments. The former operated large numbers of Soviet SA-6, SA-7, SA-9, SA-13, SA-14, SA-16 missiles. Short-range systems also were employed in infantry units.

Yugoslav antiaircraft artillery regiments operated over 5,000 guns. Self-propelled gun systems included the Soviet-made 57 mm dual ZSU-57-2 gun systems and the domestically produced triple 20 mm BOV-3s and dual 30 mm BOV-30s. Large numbers of towed antiaircraft guns of many calibers were in the inventory. Of both domestic and foreign origin, they included pieces purchased from the United States, Czechoslovakia, Switzerland, and Sweden.

Equipment

Anti aircraft systems
57 mm AZP S-60 – ?
M-55 – ?
Bofors 40mm – 142
Self-propelled Anti aircraft systems
BOV-3/30 – ~100
M53/59 Praga – 789
ZSU-57-2 – 125
MANPAD's
Strela-2 – 4700
9K34 Strela-3
9K38 Igla
SAM's
9K31 Strela-1 – 120
9K35 Strela-10 – 18
S-75 Dvina – 60	(used by Air Force and Air Defense)
S-125 Neva – 60 (used by Air Force and Air Defense)
2K12 Kub – 80~90 (used by Air Force and Air Defense)

Coastal defense
The coastal artillery batteries had both surface-to-surface missiles and guns. They operated the Soviet-designed SS-C-3 and a truck-mounted, Yugoslav-produced Brom antiship missile which was essentially a Yugoslav variant of the Soviet SS-N-2. Coastal guns included over 400 85 mm, 88 mm, 122 mm, 130 mm, and 152 mm artillery pieces obtained from the Soviet Union, the United States, captured and refurbished WW2 German and Italian pieces, and Yugoslav manufacturers.

Rank and uniforms

Ranks

Uniforms

Enlisted and NCO's
Soldiers and NCOs were issued field uniforms and service uniforms, while NCOs were authorised a dress uniform. Military school cadets wore soldier's uniforms. Soldiers' winter and summer uniforms were made of light or heavy wool and cotton in olive-green. All soldiers wore neckties of the same colors except in summer, when the uniform shirt was worn with an open collar.

There were several variations on the basic soldier's uniform and women's uniforms were of the same style as those for men, with a skirt being substituted for trousers. Paratroops wore an olive-green beret instead of the standard garrison or service cap.

Mountain troops wore distinctive stiff field caps with semi-rigid visors and ear flaps. They wore loose winter shirts, under which additional layers could be worn. The shirt itself had a lining and a collar that could be turned up to cover the neck and chin. The trousers worn by mountain troops extended just below the knee, with a strap and buckle closure. Leather leggings, heavy wool socks, and foul-weather capes also were worn by the mountain troops.

Several different patterns of camouflage uniforms were worn by select units.

Officers
Officers had to buy their field, service, dress, and full dress uniforms. They wore insignia on the lapels of the field uniform shirts. The service uniform differed only in a few details from the basic dress uniform. The shirt buttons of the dress uniform were yellow-gold instead of the service color. The trousers, jackets, and overcoats were piped red along the seams. The dress cap visor showed the same piping as the officer's shoulder boards. The general officer's dress cap had a chin strap of twisted gold cord. Other officers wore plain plastic or leather chin straps. Full dress uniforms were blue and were worn with a yellow-gold sash belt lined with the appropriate service color. Cap emblems all included a red star with yellow-gold rays, given distinctive configurations according to branch. Airborne officers had the red star resting on a silver parachute against a blue background. Cap emblems for general officers showed the same gold wreath as the shoulder boards.

See also
 Yugoslav Partisans
 Front (weekly)
 Serbian Army
 Croatian Army

References

 Logistika, naoruzanje i ratna tehnika u OS SFRJ i novonastalim drzavama..
 Kopnene vojske na prostorima Ex-YU drzava od nastanka do danas...
 
 
 
 
 Razvoj Oruzanih Snaga SFRJ [The Development of the Armed Forces of the Socialistic Federative Republic of Yugoslavia], Vols.3-2, The Ground Forces (Belgrade 1987). "This is a classified edition marked with the military security label 'for internal use' published for the 40th Anniversary of the Yugoslav Army. The entire set includes 24 books covering all aspects of the Yugoslav Army, written with consultation of the still classified primary sources" [comment in endnotes of Dimitrijevic 1997].

Further reading
Jane's Intelligence Review, June 1993

Yugoslav People's Army
Disbanded armies
Military units and formations of the Cold War

bs:Jugoslavenska narodna armija
hr:Jugoslavenska narodna armija
it:Kopnena Vojska